The 2012 Karuizawa International Curling Championship was held from January 25 to 29 at the SCAP Karuizawa Arena in Karuizawa, Japan. The bonspiel featured eight teams from each gender (five foreign teams and three Japanese teams) that played in a round-robin format. The top four teams of each gender played in a single-elimination playoff round to determine the winners.

Men

Teams
The teams are listed as follows:

Round-robin standings
Final round-robin standings

Round-robin results
All draw times listed in Japan Standard Time (UTC+9).

Draw 1
Wednesday, January 25, 13:00

Draw 2
Wednesday, January 25, 16:15

Draw 3
Wednesday, January 25, 19:30

Draw 4
Thursday, January 26, 9:00

Draw 5
Thursday, January 26, 12:15

Draw 6
Thursday, January 26, 15:30

Draw 7
Thursday, January 26, 18:45

Draw 8
Friday, January 27, 9:00

Draw 9
Friday, January 27, 12:15

Draw 10
Friday, January 27, 15:30

Draw 11
Friday, January 27, 18:45

Draw 12
Saturday, January 28, 8:00

Draw 13
Saturday, January 28, 11:15

Draw 14
Saturday, January 28, 14:30

Tiebreaker
Saturday, January 28, 17:30

Playoffs

Semifinals
Sunday, January 29, 9:00

Bronze-medal game
Sunday, January 29, 13:00

Gold Medal Final
Sunday, January 29, 13:00

Women

Teams
The teams are listed as follows:

Round-robin standings
Final round-robin standings

Round-robin results
All draw times listed in Japan Standard Time (UTC+9).

Draw 1
Wednesday, January 25, 13:00

Draw 2
Wednesday, January 25, 16:15

Draw 3
Wednesday, January 25, 19:30

Draw 4
Thursday, January 26, 9:00

Draw 5
Thursday, January 26, 12:15

Draw 6
Thursday, January 26, 15:30

Draw 7
Thursday, January 26, 18:45

Draw 8
Friday, January 27, 9:00

Draw 9
Friday, January 27, 12:15

Draw 10
Friday, January 27, 15:30

Draw 11
Friday, January 27, 18:45

Draw 12
Saturday, January 28, 8:00

Draw 13
Saturday, January 28, 11:15

Draw 14
Saturday, January 28, 14:30

Tiebreakers
Saturday, January 28, 17:30

Saturday, January 28, 20:00

Playoffs

Semifinals
Sunday, January 29, 9:00

Bronze-medal game
Sunday, January 29, 13:00

Gold-medal game
Sunday, January 29, 13:00

References

External links

2012 in curling